Ecto-NOX disulfide-thiol exchanger 1 is a protein that in humans is encoded by the ENOX1 gene.

Function

Electron transport pathways are generally associated with mitochondrial membranes, but non-mitochondrial pathways are also biologically significant. Plasma membrane electron transport pathways are involved in functions as diverse as cellular defense, intracellular redox homeostasis, and control of cell growth and survival. Members of the ecto-NOX family, such as CNOX, or ENOX1, are involved in plasma membrane transport pathways. These enzymes exhibit both a hydroquinone (NADH) oxidase activity and a protein disulfide-thiol interchange activity in series, with each activity cycling every 22 to 26 minutes (Scarlett et al., 2005 [PubMed 15882838]).

See also
Ecto-nox disulfide-thiol exchanger 2

References

Further reading